Diego Luis Soñora (born 17 July 1969 in Buenos Aires) is an Argentine former professional footballer who played as a defender or midfielder. He is the father of Alan Soñora and Joel Soñora.

Career
Soñora, nicknamed "Chiche", spent a large part of his career with Argentine giants Boca Juniors where he won 5 titles between 1988 and 1995. Soñora played a total of 266 games for Boca in all competitions, scoring 5 goals.

In 1996 Soñora moved to Major League Soccer's Dallas Burn for the league's inaugural season, 1996. He would play two seasons for Dallas, before a switch to the MetroStars in 1998. A season later, he was sent to D.C. United and helped them to the 1999 MLS Cup. Soñora left MLS after that season, and played in Chile for Deportes Concepción before a short return to the US and Tampa Bay Mutiny in 2001. He then joined Cerro Porteño of Paraguay before returning to Argentina to play for lower league side Defensores de Belgrano, before retiring as a player.

In MLS, Soñora was an All-Star in his first three seasons in the league, and scored a total of seven goals and 21 assists.

Personal life
Soñora has two footballing sons in Alan and Joel. Alan started his senior career with Independiente, while Joel played for the United States at youth level and signed with Germany's VfB Stuttgart in 2016.

Honours
Boca Juniors
Supercopa Libertadores: 1989
Recopa Sudamericana: 1990
Argentine Primera División: Apertura 1992
Copa Master de Supercopa: 1992
Copa de Oro: 1993

Dallas Burn
U.S. Open Cup: 1997

DC United
MLS Cup: 1999

Individual
MLS All Star: 1996, 1997, 1998

References

1969 births
Living people
Footballers from Buenos Aires
Argentine footballers
Argentine expatriate footballers
Boca Juniors footballers
Defensores de Belgrano footballers
FC Dallas players
New York Red Bulls players
D.C. United players
Tampa Bay Mutiny players
Cerro Porteño players
Deportes Concepción (Chile) footballers
Chilean Primera División players
Argentine Primera División players
Argentine expatriate sportspeople in Chile
Expatriate footballers in Chile
Expatriate footballers in Paraguay
Expatriate soccer players in the United States
Argentine expatriate sportspeople in the United States
Major League Soccer players
Major League Soccer All-Stars
Association football defenders